L.A. Law is an American television legal drama series that aired on NBC. Created by Steven Bochco and Terry Louise Fisher, it contained many of Bochco's trademark features including an ensemble cast, large number of parallel storylines, social drama, and off-the-wall humor. It reflected the social and cultural ideologies of the 1980s and early 1990s, and many of the cases featured on the show dealt with hot-topic issues such as capital punishment, abortion, racism, gay rights, homophobia, sexual harassment, AIDS, and domestic violence.

The series premiered on September 15, 1986, and ran for eight seasons before airing its final episode on May 19, 1994.

Series overview
All production code information comes from the U.S. Copyright Office, a division of The Library of Congress.

Episodes

Season 1 (1986–87)

Season 2 (1987–88)

Season 3 (1988–89)

Season 4 (1989–90)

Season 5 (1990–91)

Season 6 (1991–92)

Season 7 (1992–93)

Season 8 (1993–94)

References

Sources
Epguides.com episode guide

Lists of American drama television series episodes
Lists of legal television series episodes